The 2014–15 Asia League Ice Hockey season was the 12th season of Asia League Ice Hockey, which this season consists of nine teams from China, Japan, Russia, and South Korea. The league was expanded to include one new team, HC Sakhalin, for the season.

Participating teams
The table below reveals participating teams in 2014–15 season, their residence, and when they joined Asia League Ice Hockey.

Regular season
The final standing off the regular season is shown below.

Play-off
Prior to the play-off, the teams placed four and five in the regular season had a pre-qualification, in best out of three games, labeled below as Quarterfinal. The play-off schedule and results are shown below.

References

External links
 Asia League Ice Hockey

Asia League Ice Hockey
Asia League Ice Hockey seasons
Asia
Asia